Georgios Zervinis (1905 – 1983) was a Greek wrestler. He competed at the 1924, 1928 and the 1932 Summer Olympics.

References

External links
 
Georgios Zervinis' profile at the Greek Olympic Committee 

1905 births
1983 deaths
Olympic wrestlers of Greece
Wrestlers at the 1924 Summer Olympics
Wrestlers at the 1928 Summer Olympics
Wrestlers at the 1932 Summer Olympics
Greek male sport wrestlers
People from Tinos
Sportspeople from the South Aegean
20th-century Greek people